Hasanabad-e Anaraki (also Romanized as Ḩasanābād-e Ānārakī) is a village in Mohammadiyeh Rural District, in the Central District of Ardakan County, Yazd Province, Iran. At the 2006 census, its population was 106, in 26 families.

References 

Populated places in Ardakan County